"Wedding Dress" is a song recorded by South Korean singer Taeyang, and released as the second single of his first studio album Solar (2010) on November 13, 2009 through YG Entertainment. It was written by Teddy Park and composed by Park and Taeyang.

Background and composition 
After his solo debut with the extended play Hot a year prior was acclaimed by music critics and the public, YG Entertainment announced that Taeyang would release two monthly digital singles to precede his first studio album. The first single, "Where U At", was released on October and "Wedding Dress" followed in November.

"Wedding Dress" was described as a slow R&B song. Lyrically, the single describes a man who loves a woman that is going to marry another man, expressed by Taeyang's "bitter" and sad vocals. "Wedding Dress" was composed using common time in the key of  A minor, with a moderate tempo of 130 beats per minute. The vocals span from the lower octave of E4 to the higher note of A5.

Reception
"Wedding Dress" received international attention. In North America, the single gained popularity on the streaming site YouTube due to English covers and multiple parodies of the music video. This allowed his album, Solar, to top the Canadian and reach the Top 3 in the American iTunes R&B / Soul album chart, making Taeyang the first Asian artist to do so. Additionally, "Wedding Dress" reached a peak position of number three in its sixth charting week on Billboard World Digital Songs.

In Europe, even though there was no special publicity campaign to advertise the song, "Wedding Dress" ranked at number three in the Fun X Radio X-tips Chart of the Dutch music radio station FunX, based on the number of hits on the song and its music video and an online poll.

Charts

References 

Korean-language songs
Taeyang songs
2009 singles
2009 songs
YG Entertainment singles
Songs written by Teddy Park